The Faculty of Arts of Pristina is the faculty of arts of the University of Pristina, located in Pristina, Kosovo.

History 
The Faculty was founded in Pristina in 1973 as the Academy of Arts and got the present name in 1986.

Divisions 
The Faculty is divided into these departments:
Department of Visual arts (1973)
Department of Musical arts (1975)
Department of Dramatic arts (1989)

Degrees offered 
 Visual arts: Bachelor, Master
 Musical arts: Bachelor, Master
 Dramatic arts: Bachelor, Master

Note 
Notes:

References

External links 
 

Arts